Mariya Shekerova (born December 9, 1988) is an Uzbekistani-Russian judoka, who played for the heavyweight category. Shekerova represented Uzbekistan at the 2008 Summer Olympics in Beijing, where she competed for the women's heavyweight class (+78 kg). She lost the first preliminary match against France's Anne-Sophie Mondière, who successfully scored a waza-ari awasete ippon (two waza-ari), seven seconds before the five-minute period had ended.

References

External links
 
 
 
 NBC 2008 Olympics profile

Uzbekistani female judoka
Living people
Olympic judoka of Uzbekistan
Russian female judoka
Uzbekistani people of Russian descent
Judoka at the 2008 Summer Olympics
1988 births
Judoka at the 2006 Asian Games
Universiade medalists in judo
Universiade bronze medalists for Russia
Asian Games competitors for Uzbekistan
Medalists at the 2013 Summer Universiade
Naturalised citizens of Russia